Slatino may refer to:

Bulgaria
Slatino, Kyustendil Province
Slatino, Pernik Province, a village in Pernik Province

North Macedonia
 Slatino, Debarca
 Slatino, Tearce

Ukraine
 Slatyne, in Kharkiv Oblast

See also 
 Slatina (disambiguation)